Genevieve Ouellet (born 9 July 1985) is a Canadian Paralympic cyclist. She has a bronze medal from the 2008 Summer Paralympics.

References

Cyclists at the 2008 Summer Paralympics
Cyclists at the 2012 Summer Paralympics
Paralympic bronze medalists for Canada
Living people
1985 births
Canadian female cyclists
Medalists at the 2008 Summer Paralympics
Paralympic medalists in cycling
Paralympic cyclists of Canada
20th-century Canadian women
21st-century Canadian women